A niche (CanE,  or ) in Classical architecture is an exedra or an apse that has been reduced in size, retaining the half-dome heading usual for an apse.  Nero's Domus Aurea (AD 64–69) was the first semi-private dwelling that possessed rooms that were given richly varied floor plans, shaped with niches and exedrae; sheathed in dazzling polished white marble, such curved surfaces concentrated or dispersed the daylight.

A  is a very shallow niche, usually too shallow to contain statues, and may resemble a blind window (a window without openings) or sealed door. (Compare: blind arcade)

The word derives from the Latin , via the French .  The Italian nicchio may also be involved,  as the traditional decoration for the top of a niche is a scallop shell, as in the illustration, hence also the alternative term of "conch" for a semi-dome, usually reserved for larger exedra.

In Gothic architecture, a niche may be set within a tabernacle framing, like a richly decorated miniature house (aedicula), such as might serve for a reliquary. The backings for the altars in churches (reredos) can be embedded with niches for statues.  Though a niche in either Classical or Gothic contexts may be empty and merely provide some articulation and variety to a section of wall, the cult origins of the niche suggested that it be filled with a statue. One of the earliest buildings which uses external niches containing statues is the Church of Orsanmichele in Florence, built between 1380 and 1404. The Uffizi Palace in Florence (1560–81) modified the concept by setting the niche within the wall so it did not protrude. The Uffizi has two dozen or so such niches containing statues of great historical figures. In England, the Uffizi style niches were adopted at Montacute House (c. 1598), where there are nine exterior niches containing statues of the Nine Worthies. In Fra Filippo Lippi's Madonna, the trompe-l'œil niche frames her as with the canopy of estate that was positioned over a personage of importance in the late Middle Ages and Early Modern Europe. At the same time, the Madonna is represented as an iconic sculpture who has "come alive" with miraculous immediacy.

Expanding from its primary sense as an architectural recess, a niche can be applied to a rocky hollow, crack, crevice, or foothold. The sense of a niche as a clearly defined narrow space led to its use describing the relational position of an organism's species, its ecological niche.

Gallery

See also

Alcove (architecture)
Grotto
Mihrab
Formation of wave-cut platforms

References

Sir John Summerson. Heavenly Mansions, 1948.  .  Discussion of the Gothic aedicule.

Architectural elements